This page details statistics of the CONCACAF Champions' Cup and Champions League. Unless notified, these statistics concern all seasons since inception of the Champions' Cup in the 1962 season.

General performances

Finals performances

†Title shared.

 *Including one title shared.

Overall team records

In this ranking 3 points are awarded for a win, 1 for a draw and 0 for a loss. As per statistical convention in football, matches decided in extra time are counted as wins and losses, while matches decided by penalty shoot-outs are counted as draws. Teams are ranked by total points, then by goal difference, then by goals scored.

This table includes only Final Rounds as listed by CONCACAF.

CONCACAF Champions League era records

By club

Year in Bold: Club was finalist in that year

By country

† Tournament in progress

Clubs
These records are only from the Champions League era.

Biggest wins
 Home:
Herediano 8–0 Alpha United (2011–12)
UNAM 8–0 Isidro Metapán (2011–12)
Querétaro 8–0 Verdes FC (2015–16)
San Francisco 8–0 Verdes FC (2015–16)
Cruz Azul 8–0 Arcahaie (2021)
 Away:
Police United 0–11 Pachuca (2016–17)

Highest scoring
 Police United 0–11 Pachuca (2016–17)
 Puerto Rico Bayamón 1–10 América (2014–15)

Most minutes without conceding a goal
  Real Salt Lake – 587

Players
These records are only from the Champions League era.

All-time top scorers
Preliminary round goals included.

Top scorers by season

Most goals in a single game
 5 goals: Emanuel Villa (Querétaro), 8–0 against Verdes, group stage, 2015–16

Most goals in a single season
  Javier Orozco – 11 goals (2010–11)

Most hat-tricks
  Javier Orozco – 5

List of hat-tricks 

 4 Player scored 4 goals
 5 Player scored 5 goals

Managers

By year

Managers with multiple titles

By nationality
This table lists the total number of titles won by managers of each country. Accurate as of the 2022 final.

References

External links
CONCACAF official website
CONCACAF Cup at RSSSF.com

records